OFK Arsenal Kragujevac is a football club based in Kragujevac, Serbia.

History
Founded in 1930, the club took part in the 1996–97 Second League of FR Yugoslavia (Group West), finishing second from the bottom.

Honours
Kragujevac First League (Tier 5)
 2012–13, 2014–15

References

External links
 Club page at Srbijasport

1930 establishments in Serbia
Association football clubs established in 1930
Football clubs in Serbia
Sport in Kragujevac